Naho Rawa Rural LLG is a local-level government (LLG) of Madang Province, Papua New Guinea.

Wards
01. Gurumbo
02. Mungoui
03. Ranara
04. Boro
05. Tauta
06. Barim
07. Goiro
08. Niningo
09. Numbaiya
10. Gomumu
11. Saranga
12. Serengo
13. Kikipe
14. Wamunde
15. Wari
16. Butemu
17. Durukopo
18. Senei
19. Gumbarami
20. Sewe

References

Local-level governments of Madang Province